Nyang'hwale District is one of the five districts of Geita Region of Tanzania. Its administrative centre is the village Kharumwa.
It is bordered to the north by Sengerema District, to the east by Misungwi District and Shinyanga Rural District, to the south by Kahama Rural District, and to the west by Geita District.

As of 2012, the population of Nyang'hwale was 148,320. Nyang'hwale was established in 2012, when it was split off from Geita District and became part of the newly established Geita Region.

Transport
Nyang'hwale district is not connected by any paved or trunk roads. Two unpaved regional roads (R162 and R163) connect the district with Geita town, Kahama town and Sengerema District.

Administrative subdivisions

Wards
As of 2012, Nyang'hwale District was administratively divided into 12 wards:

 Bukwimba
 Busolwa
 Izunya
 Kafita
 Kakora
 Kharumwa
 Mwingiro
 Nyabulanda
 Nyang'hwale
 Nyijundu
 Nyugwa
 Shabaka

References

Districts of Geita Region